Sturanyella epicharis is a species of land snail with an operculum, a terrestrial gastropod mollusk in the family Helicinidae, the helicinids.

Distribution
This species is endemic to Micronesia.

References

 GBIF info includes the authority

Fauna of Micronesia
Helicinidae
Gastropods described in 1907
Taxonomy articles created by Polbot